Alex Bogomolov Jr. and Todd Widom were the defending champions but chose not to defend their title.

Alex Kuznetsov and Phillip Simmonds won the title after defeating Thierry Ascione and Édouard Roger-Vasselin 7–6(7–5), 6–3 in the final.

Seeds

Draw

References
 Main Draw

Internationaux de Nouvelle-Caledonie - Doubles
2007 Doubles